The Westerbach is a right tributary of the Kahl in the northern Spessart in Lower Franconia, Bavaria, Germany.

The Querbach rises in the Arzborn, a small opening in the mountainside on the Hoher Querberg, northeast of Huckelheim, near the border between Hesse and Bavaria. In Schöllkrippen the Westerbach empties in the Kahl.

Together with Sommerkahl, Reichenbach and Geiselbach, the Westernbach is one of the largest tributaries of the Kahl.

Tributaries 
 Querbach (left headstream)
 Huckelheimer Bach (right headstream)
 Hombach (right)
 Schulzengrundbach (left)
 Dörnsenbach (right)
 Herzbach (left)
 Schneppenbach (right)
 Betzenbach (right)

See also
List of rivers of Bavaria

References 

Rivers of Bavaria
Rivers of Germany